Mohammed Boualem Benchicou (born 1952 in Miliana, Aïn Defla Province) was the director and publisher of the Algerian newspaper Le Matin, closed in August 2006.

Career 

In 1989, he was one of the founders of the movement of Algerian journalists (MJA) a movement born during the opening of the media field. He then leads the team which relaunched Alger Républicain, banned from publication in 1965. Benchicou left Alger Républicain in 1991 with Saïd Mekbel and Fodil Mezali and founded the daily newspaper Le Matin of opposition.

In June 2004, he was sentenced to two years in prison for an infraction in money exchange regulation. In July, SIMPRAL, the Algiers-based government publisher, stopped printing Le Matin for its failure to pay a debt of 38 million dinars ($535,200)

PEN (the international association of writers) describes the prison in which Benchicou was in as harsh and infested with lice and cockroaches; with 50 prisoners to a cell. Benchicou's health has reportedly deteriorated since his imprisonment which caused him to develop arthritis; consequently, he lost the ability to use his right hand for writing.

Benchicou also published a book in 2004 called Bouteflika, an Algerian “fraud”, believed to be the source of all his juridic problems.

Personal life 

Mohamed Benchicou is the eldest of a family of seven children. He is married and father of three children, two girls and a boy.

Awards and honors 

 2006 PEN/Barbara Goldsmith Freedom to Write Award

Bibliography 

 Bouteflika, une imposture algérienne (Bouteflika an Algerian "Fake"), Le Matin Editions - Picollec, 2004
 Les geôles d’Alger (Prisons of Algiers), Inas - Riveneuve, 2007
 Je pardonnerai, (I'll Forgive, Poems), Inas, 2008
 Journal d'un homme libre, (A Freeman's Diaries) Auteur-Riveneuve, 2008
 Notre ami Bouteflika, de l'état rêvé à l'état scélérat (Our Friend Bouteflika), Riveneuve, 2010
 Le mensonge de Dieu (God's Lie), Michalon, 2011
 Le dernier soir du dictateur (Last Night of a Dictator), Riveneuve, 2011

External links 
 Personal website
 Online Newspaper

References 

1952 births
Living people
People from Miliana
Algerian journalists
Politics of Algeria
Algerian prisoners and detainees
21st-century Algerian people